The 1927 South Australian National Football League season was the 48th season of the top-level Australian rules football competition in South Australia and was the first season under its current name.

Ladder

Finals series

Grand Final

References 

SAFL
South Australian National Football League seasons